Faculty of Allied Health Sciences, University of Peradeniya is one of the nine faculties of University of Peradeniya and started in 2007. Faculty of Allied Health Sciences (FAHS) was inaugurated on 16 January 2007. As the faculty offers professional degree programmes, students are introduced to basic concepts in medical sciences followed by mandatory hospital based training. All degree programmes consist of 120 credits curricula which have been designed in par with International standards. Several departments have established active foreign collaborations in teaching and research. This is the very first faculty of Allied Health Sciences in Sri Lanka..

Historical Background 
The University of Peradeniya is the legacy of the University of Ceylon first established in Sri Lanka in 1942. Faculty of Allied Health Sciences (FAHS) is the youngest and the 8th Faculty of the University of Peradeniya, Sri Lanka.  This Faculty was established within 6 months of its proposal, as an exit manoeuvre to accommodate the first batch of allied health students who were admitted to University of Peradeniya under the umbrella of Faculty of Medicine,but failed due to various protest campaigns. This was inaugurated on the 16thJanuary 2007 at the Old Dental Faculty premises, Augusta Hill, Peradeniya just 1km away from the main campus.

The University Grants Commission openly invited the seven Faculties of Medicine in the country to initiate curriculum development for any number of programs from amongst the 7 on offer. Accordingly, the Faculty of Medicine, Peradeniya with a strong recommendation from its Board accepted to conduct 5 degree courses at Peradeniya, namely, 4 year B Sc degree programs for Nursing, Pharmacy,Radiography, Physiotherapy, Radiography and Medical Laboratory Science in May 2005. The University Grants Commission advertised these courses for the Advanced Level students qualifying in 2005/2006 UGC handbook and began its selection process in November 2005. At this time a protest campaign emerged from the medical students at Peradeniya against sharing facilities within the Faculty of Medicine with the allied health students. They demanded along with the members of the Government Medical Officers Association (GMOA) at Peradeniya and Kandy to move away these study programs elsewhere. This was a clear discrimination against the allied health students already entitled to utilize all facilities available in a national university according to the free education act.

Presently the Faculty consists of five academic departments and two units namely, Department of Pharmacy, Nursing, Physiotherapy, Medical Laboratory Sciences and Radiography & Radiotherapy. This faculty is currently offering five 4 year undergraduate degree programs in allied health sciences for the qualifications of B Sc Nursing, B Sc Physiotherapy, B Sc Medical Laboratory Science, B Pharm (Pharmacy), B Sc Radiotherapy and B Sc Radiography. The first batch admitted to this faculty (171 students) is now following above courses amidst the fast tracked infrastructure development process of the new faculty in parallel. At present, 150 students are admitted annually student enrolment stands at about 711 undergraduate students. There are 17 permanent academic and39 non – academic members of staff in the faculty.

The Faculty of Allied Health Sciences offers course of study leading to four years Bachelor of Science (B.Sc.) Degrees. From the academic year 2005/2006 the 1st year courses are offered on a semester based course unit system. This has significantly increased the course combinations available to students allowing far more flexibility of selection of subject areas. This system was extended to the 2nd, 3rd & 4th year courses in successive years. With the introduction of the Course Unit System, the medium of instruction for all course of study offered by the Faculty was being confined to English 

The Faculty also planned to conduct on line diploma and degree programme in allied health sciences jointly with the CDCE and are proposed for future implementation The curricula of the FAHS are designed to prepare a new generation of allied health workers whilst assisting the current workforce to adapt to new knowledge to face the new challenges in modern medical practice, where, doctors, nurses medical laboratory scientists, physiotherapists, pharmacists, radiotherapists and radiographers work in a team for quality health care delivery. Their dedication, training, ability and attitudes form the basis of quality health care.

This new FAHS would bridge the knowledge and skill gap between the doctors who are trained to the highest standard via the Post Graduate Institute of Medicine PGIM) of the University of Colombo, and the allied health personnel, enabling their specialized knowledge applicable in full force in this country whilst preparing its graduates to be competitive anywhere in the world.

In Sri Lanka, we can still be consoled that many doctors are supportive of the provision of high quality university education for the allied health students Thus, we believe a cordial relationship will develop against all odds among allied health graduates and doctors to provide better health care for the sick in this country in the future.

The Organization of the Faculty

Departments of Study 
The number of departments of study in the faculty are six.The departments of study are,

Department of Basic Sciences

General Information 
Basic science leads to a better understanding of natural phenomena. It looks for "knowledge and discovery of facts" to enable one to understand an already existing phenomenon. Basic science is the foundation of all scientific research. If you want the greatest long-term yield for human health, there’s no better investment. It may not be as glamorous as other types of research, but basic science discoveries can be applied across all medical disciplines to provide solutions to all diseases. The Department of Basic Sciences offers course modules to all first-year undergraduate students entering the Faculty of Allied Health Sciences. The Department aims to provide superior understanding of concepts in the fields of Human Physiology, Human Anatomy, Basic Biochemistry, General Pathology, Basic Statistics and Analytical Chemistry. These course modules are designed to deliver extensive foundational theoretical and practical knowledge to support all six specific Degree programmes offered by the faculty. Practical implementation of theoretical knowledge is achieved through well-designed laboratories, where students learn the practical aspects of Biochemistry, Human Physiology and Analytical Chemistry. The Department provides solid foundational knowledge in all six Degree programmes. The Basic Sciences Department was inaugurated under the headship of Prof H.M.T.U. Herath in 2017 and is currently led by Dr T.P. Gamagedara. The Department has a strong teaching and research focus. The Department has highly qualified and experienced staff, including four permanent academic, six temporary academic and six non-academic staff members. In addition, eminent visiting academics conduct lectures on special selected topics. The Department is involved in research catering to both undergraduate and postgraduate levels. The Department has far reaching goals and will continue to develop infrastructure with state-of-the-art facilities to support student learning and develop new courses that cater to the dynamic academic and research needs of our country and the world more broadly.

Facilities and Resources 

 Basic Science Laboratory

 Anatomy Museum

 Mini Library
 The ceremonial opening of the newly established Anatomy Museum of the Dept. of Basic Sciences with the collaboration of Otago University, New Zealand and Dept. of Anatomy, Faculty of Medicine, University of Peradeniya was held on 17th December 2021. The Dean, Dr Janaka Marasinghe, Head, Dept. of Anatomy, Faculty of Medicine, Dr Himani Amarathunga, accompanied by the Heads, the professors and student representatives of the Faculty of Allied Health Sciences graced this occasion. Members of Otago University were joined online.

Department of Medical Laboratory Science

General Information 
Department of Medical Laboratory Science offers a four-year professional degree program that Bachelor of Science Honors in Medical Laboratory Science (BScHons MLS). The degree is designed with 120 credits curriculum to produce competent graduates in the field of Medical Laboratory Science to cater the growing demands of the society and to provide quality laboratory service for the public. Graduates obtain high standard skills and knowledge in variety of fields including clinical biochemistry, heamatology, clinical microbiology, histotechnology and transfusion medicine which enable them to work in any clinical laboratory in national as well as international.

Facilities and Resources 

 The Department of MLS has several laboratories such as microbiology, molecular biology, histology, clinical chemistry and haematology.

 The Department of MLS provides medical diagnostic laboratory service to the community. This laboratory offers number of routine laboratory tests for reasonable price and it facilitates training opportunities for undergraduate students.

Department of Nursing

General Information 
The Bachelor of Science Nursing Programme is a pre-registration degree course designed to produce nurse practitioners capable of proving safe and effective nursing care of a high standard in a variety of settings such as generalist nursing, midwifery nursing, child health nursing and community health nursing. The department provides a sound scientific and humanistic foundation for nursing practice, enabling the students to develop competencies necessary for the delivery of nursing care related to prevention, maintenance, cure, rehabilitation and promotion of health. It also addresses the acute and chronic health problems of clients throughout their life span, including care of the child-bearing woman. Furthermore, they would acquire confidence in self-direction for the development of nursing as a profession and its evolving contributions to other disciplines of health care. The program is designed to encourage the students to acquire knowledge and insights through self-directed learning and innovative approaches.

Facilities and Resources 

 Skills Laboratory - Skills laboratory provides students with the opportunity for hands-on practice with anatomical models before applying skills in real life situations, preparing them for better practice in the workforce. In the skills lab, we have a large collection of educational tools.

Department of Pharmacy

General Information 
The Department of Pharmacy at the University of Peradeniya (UoP) was one of five departments established in 2007 in the first ever Faculty of Allied Health Sciences (FAHS) in Sri Lanka and has been a leader in pharmacy education in the country since its inception. Dr T. Nimmi C. Athuraliya, a former head of the Department of Pharmacology, Faculty of Medicine, UoP was the founder head of the Department of Pharmacy. Under her leadership an international consultative workshop to develop a curriculum for the Bachelor of Pharmacy (BPharm) degree was conducted in November 2005. This was the first ever BPharm curriculum development programme held in Sri Lanka with participation from local and international experts from India, Pakistan and Malaysia, representing different areas of expertise in pharmacy.

The 13 academic staff members of the Department make the largest contribution to imparting theoretical knowledge and practical skills required by pharmacy professionals to students enrolled in the Bachelor of Pharmacy Honors (BPharmHons) degree program at the FAHS, UoP. The current (2021) student intake is 35 with a planned increase to 50, in 2023. The BPharmHons degree is a four-year degree covering areas of both pharmacy practice and pharmaceutical sciences. As of 2022 more than 230 students have graduated with a BPharm degree and are presently employed in different fields of pharmacy in Sri Lanka and abroad. The majority of the graduates serve as government pharmacists in the network of public hospitals in Sri Lanka while the rest are employed in the regulatory field both in the public and private sectors, pharmaceutical industry, academia, private hospitals and community pharmacy.

Facilities and Resources 

 The Department of Pharmacy is located within the premises of the Faculty of Allied Health Sciences in the Professor Senaka Bibile building in Augusta Hill, Peradeniya. The building houses lecture theatres, administrative and staff offices, instrumentation laboratory and manufacturing laboratory of the Department. Construction of the pharmacy laboratory complex with funding from the World Bank AHEAD (Accelerating Higher Education Expansion and Development) operation of the Ministry of Education commenced in 2019 as an extension to the Professor Senaka Bibile building and the laboratory complex was opened in 2021. The laboratory complex consists of three laboratories: 1) pharmaceutical microbiology; 2) pharmaceutics; and 3) pharmaceutical chemistry. Each laboratory can accommodate 50 students per session. In addition, the Department of Pharmacy has a research laboratory in the Diamond Jubilee Building of FAHS. The FAHS library and Information Technology (IT) centre are located within the faculty premises providing easy access to library facilities and IT laboratory to BPharm undergraduates.

 The Department of Pharmacy has 13 academic staff members (including three professors) with ten staff members having postgraduate degrees (8 PhDs and 2 MPhils) in diverse fields including pharmacology and toxicology, clinical pharmacy, pharmacy practice, pharmaceutics, pharmaceutical microbiology, pharmaceutical biotechnology, pharmaceutical chemistry, medicinal chemistry, cheminformatics, metabolomics, pharmaceutical analysis, organic synthesis, pharmacognosy, pharmacoeconomics and pharmacy education. The external teaching panel includes resource persons from other faculties of UoP, other national Universities, industry and international collaborators for specific areas of the curriculum. A teaching panel from the CASPPER (Collaboration of Australians and Sri Lankans for Pharmacy Practice, Education and Research) provides teaching support for the courses on clinical pharmacy. Eleven non-academic staff members provide administrative support and runs and maintains the laboratories.

 For student training, the Department of Pharmacy has developed a collaborative network with government and private healthcare institutions for hospital-based placements, community pharmacies, regulatory authorities and industry for hospital pharmacy, clinical pharmacy, community pharmacy and industrial pharmacy training.

 In 2018, the Department of Pharmacy initiated an innovative concept for practical training for BPharm undergraduates by signing a memorandum of understanding with the State Pharmaceuticals Corporation (SPC) of Sri Lanka to operate a retail SPC pharmacy outlet attached to UoP (University Rajya Osusala). The first ever such initiative by a state University in Sri Lanka provides students a training centre to practice drug dispensing, patient education, pharmacy management and legal and ethical norms in pharmacy practice.

 The BPharm undergraduates of FAHS reside in residential facilities of the UoP and has access to resources common to the all students of the UoP including a network of libraries, department of physical education and gymnasium, health centre, student services and numerous societies and clubs promoting learning, socio-cultural diversity and recreation.

Department of Physiotheraphy

General Information 
The department of Physiotherapy, Faculty of Allied Health Sciences was inaugurated on 16th January 2007 at the University of Peradeniya as one of the first department to offer undergraduate programme in physiotherapy in Sri Lanka. The B.Sc. (Honours) Physiotherapy progaramme offered by the department is designed to produce proficient graduates and professionals in the field of physiotherapy to cater the growing demands and to advance the quality of physiotherapy services in Sri Lanka. The programme provides the students with high standard of clinical skills and knowledge in variety of fields including neurological, musculoskeletal, pediatric, cardio respiratory, and sports physiotherapy which meet both local and international criteria. The Department of Physiotherpy inaugurated the first M.Sc. degree programme in Physiotherapy in Sri Lanka in 2022 to cater the long demand of physiotherapy graduates in Sri Lanka.

The Department provides appropriate and effective learning environment including infrastructure facilities, laboratory facilities, library facilities and appropriate clinical practice sites to support the students to successfully achieve the programme outcomes. The department has established active collaborations with foreign universities and institutions to provide greater exposure to the students in academic and research.

Vision 
To be a centre of eminence in physiotherapy education with global recognition.

Mission  
To prepare physiotherapy graduates with entry-level physiotherapy skills, competencies, professional and ethical behaviors. As lifelong learners and reflective practitioners, they will serve the health care needs of the community while contributing to the advancement of the profession of physiotherapy.

Facilities and Resources 

 The Department of Physiotherapy, Faculty of Allied Health Sciences provides lecture halls facilities with all modern audio visual facilities. The department is equipped with modern physiotherapeutic equipment and laboratory facilities such as Exercise science laboratory, Lung Function Testing Laboratory, Movement analysis laboratory etc. for teaching – learning and research activities.

 The Department of Physiotherapy established a Physiotherapy Service Unit with the purpose of providing the best practical exposure to the students as well as physiotherapy service for out-patients. It is a well-equipped physiotherapy centre providing all physiotherapy services by qualified and well experienced teaching panel of the Department of Physiotherapy with advanced physiotherapeutic techniques and modern physiotherapy modalities and facilities.

 Lung function test unit was established in 2017 at the Department of Physiotherapy in order to provide practical exposure to the physiotherapy undergraduates. Its service is also extended to out-patients. Lung function testing Unit is equipped with advanced pulmonary function testing machine for complete pulmonary function testing including Spirometry Test (FVC, MVV) and Diffusion Capacity for Carbon monoxide Test (DLCO Test). Tests are conducted by the well trained physiotherapy teaching panel of the Department of Physiotherapy.

 Exercise Science Laboratory of the Department of Physiotherapy is equipped with highly advanced exercise testing equipment including 3D motion analysis system, which analyzes the biomechanics of human movements. Exercise Science Laboratory is also advanced with an exercise ECG machine and spirometer.

 The department of Physiotherapy also recognizes research and community activities as core functions of the department. The department engaged in various research and community activities including community based rehabilitation programme, geriatric care programmes and various other outreach rehabilitation programmes to provide physiotherapy services to the community.

Department of Radiography/Radiotheraphy

References

External links
 Official website

Faculty of Allied Health Sciences